Canal Point is a census-designated place (CDP) and unincorporated community in Palm Beach County, Florida, United States. Canal Point is located along the eastern shore of Lake Okeechobee, to the northeast of Pahokee and to the northwest of Bryant. The unincorporated community was originally inhabited by the Calusa tribe until almost 400 years ago. Whites began occupying the area in the 1900s decade, establishing an agrarian community. The completion of the West Palm Beach Canal in 1917 allowed crops to be shipped by boat to West Palm Beach and then to other areas of the country, while construction of Conners Highway in 1924 resulted in crops being transported by motor vehicle.

Today, the community still relies heavily on agriculture, especially sugar. The town is very small with very little infrastructure. Canal Point has a small population, with 476 people counted in the 2020 census, up from 367 in the 2010 census.

Geography
Canal Point is located at  (26.862060, -80.630543).

Climate

History
In 1909, Canal Point became the first White settlement on the eastern shore of Lake Okeechobee. The Southern States Land and Timber Company began planting sugarcane in the area in 1917. Around that time, the West Palm Beach Canal was completed. The canal connected Lake Okeechobee at Canal Point to West Palm Beach, allowing farms to sell crops to West Palm Beach or elsewhere in the United States via the Florida East Coast Railway. Transportation of crops by motor vehicle from the area to other destinations began in 1924 with the completion of Conners Highway, which mostly followed the path of the West Palm Beach Canal.

Unlike other communities along the southeastern and eastern shores of Lake Okeechobee, Canal Point was relatively unscathed by the 1928 hurricane. However, the local economy suffered greatly and never recovered after construction of the Herbert Hoover Dike limited boat traffic in the 1930s. Residents saved the historic Canal Point School from demolition and hoped to convert it into an agricultural museum, but the building was destroyed by a fire in 2008. About three years earlier, Hurricane Wilma wrecked several other historic buildings in the community.

Demographics

As of the census of 2000, there were 525 people, 197 households, and 127 families residing in the CDP. The population density was 339.3 inhabitants per square mile (130.8/km2). The racial makeup of the CDP was 55.05% White (43.1% were Non-Hispanic White,) 17.52% African American, 0.38% Native American, 0.57% Asian, 0.19% Pacific Islander, 21.14% from other races, and 5.14% from two or more races. Hispanic or Latino of any race were 35.05% of the population.

There were 197 households, out of which 34.5% had children under the age of 18 living with them, 45.2% were [married couples living together, 13.7% had a female householder with no husband present, and 35.5% were non-families. 29.4% of all households were made up of individuals, and 9.1% had someone living alone who was 65 years of age or older. The average household size was 2.66 and the average family size was 3.38.

In the CDP, the population was spread out, with 30.5% under the age of 18, 7.6% from 18 to 24, 29.1% from 25 to 44, 23.0% from 45 to 64, and 9.7% who were 65 years of age or older. The median age was 34 years. For every 100 females, there were 95.9 males. For every 100 females age 18 and over, there were 108.6 males.

The median income for a household in the CDP was $37,813, and the median income for a family was $29,792. Males had a median income of $32,232 versus $12,283 for females. The per capita income for the CDP was $18,625. About 19.5% of families and 14.4% of the population were below the poverty line, including 11.8% of those under age 18 and 7.8% of those age 65 or over.

As of 2000, English as a first language accounted for 65.00% of all residents, while Spanish is the first language of 35.00% of the population.

Living 
Almost the entirety of Canal Point's populace is involved in agriculture. Most are independent farmers or employees of one of the large local sugar co-operatives, the largest three being the US Sugar Corporation, Osceola Farms, and Fanjul Sugar. The town has an access point to the Lake Okeechobee Scenic Trail.

Transportation
The Palm Tran Route 47 connects Canal Point to Pahokee, Belle Glade, and South Bay, as well as to Route 40, which links Belle Glade to Wellington. State Road 15 and US routes 98 and 441 move jointly northeastward through Canal Point, generally parallel to the shore of Lake Okeechobee, with the road locally referred to as E. Main Street. The road is adjoined by the northwest-southeast moving State Road 700, locally known as W. Main Street and Conners Highway, just south of the West Palm Beach Canal. State Road 700 moves southeastward and rejoins State Road 15 and US routes 98 and 441 near Twenty Mile Bend.

Education

Kathryn E. Cunningham/Canal Point Elementary School is the only school located in Canal Point. The school was named for former principal, Kathryn E. Cunningham, who retired from education after 50 years. Cunningham was instrumental in getting the school built and a supporter of children's education her entire life.
Pahokee Middle School
Pahokee High School
There are no colleges or universities in Canal Point. However, Palm Beach State College has campuses in Belle Glade and Loxahatchee Groves.

Notable people
Anquan Boldin, former NFL wide receiver for the Arizona Cardinals, Baltimore Ravens, San Francisco 49ers, and Detroit Lions, raised in Canal Point.
Laura Upthegrove, "Queen of the Everglades", famous bandit, owned and operated and died at a gas station in Canal Point.

Images

References

Census-designated places in Palm Beach County, Florida
Census-designated places in Florida
Unincorporated communities in Palm Beach County, Florida
Unincorporated communities in Florida
Populated places on Lake Okeechobee